Why Does Herr R. Run Amok? is a 1970 West German drama film directed by Michael Fengler and Rainer Werner Fassbinder. It was entered into the 20th Berlin International Film Festival.

Plot
Herr Rabb has worked for 18 months at a small architectural firm and displays loyalty and respect for his colleagues. He and his wife harmoniously attend a parent-teacher conference, watch television and plan for the future. They visit his parents, where his mother seems slightly overbearing. He was rebuked at work and his son could be doing better at school, but these do not seem to be serious issues. His wife tells friends that he is anticipating promotion to another office. Rabb is at work, getting his health check-up with few issues apart from slightly raised blood pressure and persistent headaches, and later making an embarrassingly tipsy speech at a dinner-party for his colleagues and boss, after which his wife calls him fat and stupid. Herr R. watches television with his wife and a talkative neighbor. After listening to the neighbor talking about her skiing trip, Herr R. gets up and silently bludgeons to death the neighbor, his wife and son, Amadeus, with a large candlestick. The next day, he reports to work on time. When the police arrive, they find he has hanged himself in the bathroom.

Cast
 Lilith Ungerer - Frau R.
 Kurt Raab - Herr R.
 Lilo Pempeit - Kollegin im Büro
 Franz Maron - Chef
 Harry Baer - Kollege im Büro
 Peter Moland - Kollege im Büro
 Hanna Schygulla - Schulfreundin von Frau R.
 Ingrid Caven - Nachbarin
 Irm Hermann - Nachbarin
 Doris Mattes - Nachbarin
 Hannes Gromball - Nachbar
 Vinzenz Sterr - Opa Raab (as Herr Sterr)
 Maria Sterr - Oma Raab (as Frau Sterr)
 Peer Raben - Schulfreund von Herrn R.
 Eva Pampuch - Schallplattenverkäuferin
 Carla Egerer - Schallplattenverkäuferin (as Carla Aulaulu)

References

External links

1970 films
1970 drama films
German drama films
West German films
1970s German-language films
Films directed by Rainer Werner Fassbinder
Films directed by Michael Fengler
Films produced by Michael Fengler
Films set in Munich
1970s German films